The 2004 Qatar Open, known as the 2004 Qatar ExxonMobil Open, for sponsorship reasons,  was a tennis tournament played on outdoor hard courts at the Khalifa International Tennis Complex in Doha in Qatar and was part of the International Series of the 2004 ATP Tour. The tournament ran from 5 January through 11 January 2004. Nicolas Escudé won the singles title.

Finals

Singles

 Nicolas Escudé defeated  Ivan Ljubičić 6–3, 7–6(7–4)

Doubles

 Martin Damm /  Cyril Suk defeated  Stefan Koubek /  Andy Roddick 6–2, 6–4

References

External links
 Official website
 ATP tournament profile

 
Qatar Open
Open
Qatar Open (tennis)